The Writers Guild of America Award for Television: Long Form – Original is an award presented by the Writers Guild of America to the writers of the best long-form program not based on the previously published material of the season. It has been awarded since the 49th Annual Writers Guild of America Awards in 1996.

Through the 70s and 80s, numerous categories were presented to recognize writing for long-form programs, some of them were for anthology series or limited series while others also included television films as "long form". The divisions between original and adapted were presented in some of the categories presented during these years, though not all of them.

Since the 39th Writers Guild of America Awards in 1976, two categories are presented to recognize the writing in long form television media, these two categories remain to this day and are: Long Form – Original and Long Form – Adapted.

Name History
 Best Anthology Original (1975, 1978)
 Best Original Comedy Anthology (1982-1983)
 Best Original Drama Anthology (1982-1985)
 Best Original/Adapted Comedy Anthology (1984-1985)
 Best Original/Adapted Multi-Part Long Form Series (1984)
 Best Anthology Episode/Single Program (1986-1990)
 Best Long Form - Original (1986-present)

Winners and nominees
The year indicates when each season aired. Single winner of the years is left unmarked while other winners are highlighted in gold and in bold.

1970s
Best Anthology Original

1980s
Best Original Comedy Anthology

Best Original Drama Anthology

Best Original/Adapted Comedy Anthology

Best Original/Adapted Multi-Part Long Form Series

Best Anthology Episode/Single Program

Best Long Form - Original

1990s
Best Anthology Episode/Single Program

Best Long Form - Original

2000s

2010s

2020s

References

External links

Screenplay